The 1963 Saint Louis Billikens men's soccer team represented Saint Louis University during the 1963 NCAA soccer season. The Billikens won their fourth NCAA title this season. It was the sixth ever season the Billikens fielded a men's varsity soccer team.

Roster 

 Bill Bayer
 Dave Behnen
 Fred Boyd
 Bill Brown
 Jim Bryon
 John Butler
 Don Ceresia
 Larry Cronin
 Bob Ernst
 Carl Gentile
 Jack Gilsinn
 Joe Hennessy
 Dan Leahy
 Kevin Kelley 
 Terry Knox
 Tom Layton
 Raymond Mann
 Tom Mataya
 Pat McBride
 Mike Moore
 Jim Rick
 Gerry Schwalbe
 David Sirinek
 Adrian Vanderzalm

Schedule 

|-
!colspan=6 style=""| Regular season
|-

|-

|-

|-

|-

|-

|-

|-

|-

|-

|-
!colspan=6 style=""| NCAA Tournament
|-

|-

|-

|-

References 

 Results

Saint Louis Billikens men's soccer seasons
1963 NCAA soccer independents season
Saint Louis
NCAA Division I Men's Soccer Tournament-winning seasons
NCAA Division I Men's Soccer Tournament College Cup seasons